Homa may refer to:

Places

Ethiopia 
 Homa (woreda), a district in Oromia Region, Ethiopia

Kenya 
 Homa Bay, a town and a bay on the shore of Lake Victoria in Kenya
 Homa Mountain, a volcano near Homa Bay, Kenya

Iran 
 Chal Homa, Markazi, Iran
 Homa, Iran, a village in Lorestan Province, Iran
 Homa, North Khorasan, Iran, a village
 Homa-ye Bala (disambiguation), places in Iran
 Homag (disambiguation), various places in Iran
 Homay, Iran (disambiguation), various places in Iran

Israel 
 Har Homa, East Jerusalem neighborhood, Israel

United States 
 Homa Hills, Wyoming
 La Homa, Texas, U.S.

People

People with the given name Homa 
 Homa Arjomand (born 1952), Iranian political activist
 Homa Darabi (1994–1940), Iranian pediatrician, academic, and political activist 
 Homa Vafaie Farley, Iranian-born potter and ceramist
 Homa Hoodfar, Canadian-Iranian sociocultural anthropologist
 Homa Katouzian (born 1942), Iranian economist, historian, sociologist and literary critic
 Homa Mirafshar (born 1946), Iranian-born American poet and songwriter 
 Homa Nategh (1934–2016), Iranian historian
 Homa Sarshar (born 1946), Iranian-American author, activist, media personality
 Homa Shaibany (born c. 1913), Iranian surgeon, first female surgeon in Iran
 Homa Rousta (1946–2015), Iranian film and stage actress

People with the surname Homa 
 Bernard Homa (1900–1991), British medical doctor and politician
 Max Homa (born 1990), American professional golfer on the PGA Tour
 Peter Homa, British health service manager

Musical groups 
 Stay Homas
 Tex La Homa

Other uses 
Homa (ritual), a religious practice in Hinduism, Buddhism and Jainism, involving making offerings into a consecrated fire 
 Homa (genus), an insect genus in the tribe Empoascini
 Homa (mythology), a bird creature of Persian mythology
 Another spelling for Haoma in Zoroastrianism
 Homa F.C., a professional league football club based in Tehran, Iran
 Homeostatic model assessment, a medical formula for quantifying insulin resistance
 Harmonic Oscillator Model of Aromaticity, a method for quantifying aromaticity
 Iran Air's acronym, in Persian-language
 Homa Darabi foundation, founded by Parvin Darabi
Hochelaga-Maisonneuve, neighborhood of Montreal, Canada colloquially known as "HoMa" in short form
 Staff of Homa, a polearm weapon in the RPG game Genshin Impact
 Viraja Homa, Hindu fire-sacrifice ceremony

See also

 Haoma, Avestan language name of a plant and its divinity
 Huma (disambiguation), which has several different meanings
 Houma (disambiguation), which has several different meanings

